Sony AATH is an Indian Bengali-language general entertainment pay television channel owned by Culver Max Entertainment, with programming mostly consisting of television series from SET India dubbed in Bengali. It was launched in 2009 as Channel 8, and its HD feed was launched on October 10, 2021. Sony Aath is Sony Pictures Networks India's first regional television channel, and is the fastest growing Bengali-language television channel in India.

Current Programming
Aladdin – Naam Toh Suna Hoga
Baal Veer
CID
Crime Patrol
Gopal Bhar
Mahabali hanuman
Nix: Je Sob Pare
Nut Boltur Kandokarkhana
Panchotantrer Mantro 
Tomar Meye Ki Kore?

Premiered films

Bengali Telefilms 
 Kala Jadoo
 Sei Raat
 Sahebbarir Bhoot
 Raktakto 31
 Raat
 Pasher Ghor
 Operation Hamilton
 Nishi Raat
 Mriytur Hatchhani 
 Roommate
 Maya
 Lal Saheber Kuthir 
 Lal Saheber Kuthir: Khoj
 Jungle E Sei Raat
 Jungle Er Oi Banshita
 Darjata Khola Thak
 Circuit House
 Bhootbari Forest 
 Araale Ke?

Hollywood films premiere in Bengali dubbed version 
 Justice League 
 Fast and Furious 
 Fast and Furious 9
 Kong: Skull Island 
 Godzilla 
 The Mummy
 Men In Black 3 
 Spider-Man Homecoming 
 It 
 The Conjuring

Former Programming
Aahat
Bhanwar (TV series)
C.I.D. Kolkata Bureau
Encounter (Indian TV series)
F.I.R. (TV series)
Hotath 37 Bochor Por
Konta Satti Konta Durghatona
Ladies Special
Bharat Ka Veer Putra – Maharana Pratap
Satya Ghatana Abalambane
Surya The Super Cop
Virrudh

See also
Sony
ATN Sony Aath

References

External links

 

Bengali-language television channels in India
Sony Pictures Television
Television stations in Kolkata
Television channels and stations established in 2009
Sony Pictures Networks India
2009 establishments in West Bengal